Britney Spears (born 1981) is an American singer, songwriter, and dancer.

Britney may also refer to:

 Britney (album), a 2001 album by Britney Spears
 "Britney" (song), a 2008 song by Bebo Norman
 "Britney", a song by Busted from the album Busted, 2002

People with the given name
Britney Gallivan (born 1985), best known for determining the maximum number of times that paper or other materials can be folded in half
Britney Dolonius (born 1992), Filipina actress and model 
Britney Young (born 1987/1988), American actress

See also
 Brittany (disambiguation)
 Brit (disambiguation)